Laxmi Nagar is a village in the Nicobar district of Andaman and Nicobar Islands, India. It is located in the Great Nicobar tehsil. It is the location of India's southernmost land tip, Indira Point.

Laxmi Nagar and Joginder Nagar were originally Shompen camping sites. The Shompens deserted the place when forests were cleared to make way for a village of ex-servicemen.

Demographics 

According to the 2011 census of India, Laxmi Nagar has 13 households. The effective literacy rate (i.e. the literacy rate of population excluding children aged 6 and below) is 63.6%.

See also 
 Kanyakumari
 List of extreme points of India
 Extreme points of Indonesia

References 

Villages in Great Nicobar tehsil